Lalemant is an unorganized territory in the Canadian province of Quebec, located in the regional county municipality of Le Fjord-du-Saguenay. The region had a population of 0 in the Canada 2011 Census, and covered a land area of 190.52 km2.

The territory corresponds to and is named after the geographic township of Lalemant. The township was proclaimed in 1920 and named in honour of Jesuit Gabriel Lalemant (1610 - 1649).

References

Unorganized territories in Saguenay–Lac-Saint-Jean
1920 establishments in Quebec